Diane Linley Langmore  (born 1941) is an Australian historian best known for her work as general editor of the Australian Dictionary of Biography.

Education and career 
Langmore was born in Melbourne in 1941. She matriculated from Firbank Church of England Girls' School in 1958. She graduated from the University of Melbourne with a BA (1963) and DipEd (1964). She then completed a MA at the University of Papua New Guinea (1973), followed by a PhD at the Australian National University (1982).

She joined the staff of the Australian Dictionary of Biography (ADB) in 1982 as a research editor and was promoted to deputy general editor in 1997. When general editor John Ritchie had a stroke, Langmore took over as acting general editor but was not confirmed in the role until May 2004. Under her stewardship Volume 16 was completed and published in 2002, Volume 17 in 2007 and Volume 18 was a quarter complete prior to her retirement in May 2008. Langmore contributed 50 biographies to the ADB.

In the 2008 Australia Day Honours Langmore was made a Member of the Order of Australia for "service in recording the history of social sciences and humanities as General Editor of the Australian Dictionary of Biography". In 2009 she was awarded the Australian Dictionary of Biography Medal.

Selected works

As author

As editor

References 

1941 births
Living people
20th-century Australian historians
21st-century Australian historians
University of Melbourne alumni
University of Papua New Guinea alumni
Australian National University alumni
Members of the Order of Australia